Biasini is an Italian surname. Notable people with the surname include:

 Giorgio Biasini, Italian bobsledder
 Sarah Biasini (born 1977), French actress
 Oddo Biasini (1917–2009), Italian politician 
 

Italian-language surnames